Paolo Perino (born 10 March 1988) is an Italian male rower, medal winner at senior level at the World Rowing Championships and European Rowing Championships.

References

External links
 

1988 births
Living people
Sportspeople from Genoa
Italian male rowers
Rowers of Fiamme Gialle
World Rowing Championships medalists for Italy